Victoria Inyama is a Nigerian actress.

Early life and education
Inyama was born in Enugu State, which is the south-eastern part of Nigeria predominantly occupied by the Igbo speaking people of Nigeria. She obtained her first B.Sc from the University of Lagos. She spoke on Channels TV where she stated during an interview, that she currently is in school studying counseling in the Lewisham Counseling school of London in order for her to be able to aid people mentally. She has also attended the Greenwich school of management located in London.

Career 
In 1990, she started her career. She claimed in an interview that actor Alex Usifo first saw her and helped introduce her to the Nigerian film business.
Inyama after marrying Godwin Okri, relocated to United Kingdom and this action was detrimental to her acting career as she left the entertainment business and focused on her family.

Personal life
Inyama was married to Godwin Okri and they have three children together.

Through her social media platform, Inyama revealed her battle with cancer in 2006.

Filmography
 Silent Night
 Danger Zone
 Odum
 Love from Above
 Eze Nwanyi
 Glamour Boys
 Iyanga
 Barraccuda

References

External links
 Victoria Inyama Instagram Page 

Living people
University of Lagos alumni
Year of birth missing (living people)
Igbo actresses
Nigerian female adult models
21st-century Nigerian actresses
Nigerian film actresses
People from Enugu
20th-century Nigerian actresses